Henry Clinton Fall (25 December 1862, Farmington, New Hampshire – 14 November 1939, Tyngsboro, Massachusetts) was an American entomologist.

Fall received in 1884 his bachelor's degree from Dartmouth College in New Hampshire. He taught from 1884 to 1889 mathematics and physics in Chicago secondary schools, and then in 1889 for health reasons moved to Southern California. From 1889 to 1917 he taught physical sciences at Pasadena High School and was, for almost a quarter of a century, the head of the physical sciences department. A visit from George Henry Horn inspired Fall to begin scientific study of insects and to write an 1893 article on beetles.

In 1917 he retired to live in Tyngsboro, Massachusetts, which is about 43 kilometers (26 miles) in a straight line to Cambridge, Massachusetts. He continued to identify and curate insect specimens sent to him and published his last scientific paper in 1937.

Fall's collection includes about 20,000 different insect species. He inspired many coleopterists, including Edwin Van Dyke and Frank Ellsworth Blaisdell.

Fall has a scholarship in his name at Dover High School in Dover, NH. The inaugural scholarship winner was Madigan Jennison-Henderson (2021).

References

External links

American entomologists
Dartmouth College alumni
People from Farmington, New Hampshire
1862 births
1939 deaths